The 2017 Úrvalsdeild karla, also known as Pepsi-deild karla for sponsorship reasons, was the 106th season of top-flight Icelandic football. Twelve teams contested the league, including the defending champions FH, who won their eighth league title in 2016.

The season began on 30 April 2017 and concluded on 30 September 2017.

Teams

The 2017 Úrvalsdeild was contested by twelve teams, ten of which played in the division the previous year and two teams promoted from 1. deild karla. The bottom two teams from the previous season, Fylkir and Þróttur Reykjavík, were relegated to the 2017 1. deild karla and were replaced by KA and Grindavík, champions and runners-up of the 2016 1. deild karla respectively.

Club information

Source: Scoresway

Personnel and kits

Managerial changes

League table

Results
Each team will play home and away once against every other team for a total of 22 games played each.

Top goalscorers

References

External links
  

Úrvalsdeild karla (football) seasons
1
Iceland
Iceland